The Kerch Strait ferry line was a ferry connection across the Strait of Kerch that connected the Crimean Peninsula and Krasnodar Krai.

The ferry ran across the narrowest part of the strait (about 5 km) between Port Krym (harbour Crimea) by the city of Kerch and Port Kavkaz (harbour Caucasus) on the Chushka Spit, on the site of the former Kerch railway bridge. It carried passengers, automotive and railroad transport. The ferry was on the European route E97 and connected its parts, А290 (formerly M25) and М-17 highways.

After the 2014 Russian annexation of Crimea, ferry traffic peaked, but as the Crimean Bridge across the strait opened in 2018–2020, it overtook the traffic flow from the ferry, rendering its usage for transportation financially unfeasible, and the ferry line stopped operations in late 2020.

History
The ferry line was established in 1954, on the site of the former Kerch railway bridge. From 1993 to 2004 railroad transportation was suspended due to replacement of aged train-ferries.

Since the dissolution of the Soviet Union, it was administered by Russia and Ukraine through the joint venture “Crimea-Kuban Crossing”. In 1998, this company was reorganized into a Ukrainian state-owned enterprise, "Kerch Strait ferry line". On 17 March 2014, during the annexation of Crimea by the Russian Federation, the company was nationalised by the Republic of Crimea, and had been since administered by Russia only.

The use of the ferry rose sharply after the annexation, and in June 2015, the ferry operator considered a daily passenger count of 11,000 normal.

The 2018 opening of the road section of the new Crimean Bridge, crossing the strait about 10 km further south, greatly reduced demand for the ferry. In November 2019, it was announced that passenger and freight ferries had ceased operation, as the service was not breaking even. While occasional ferries were still used for rail freight transportation, the opening of the rail bridge across the strait overtook that last remaining traffic, and at the end of September 2020 the ferry operator AnRussTrans ceased operating the rail ferry line, with the last sailing taking place on 28 September 2020. AnRussTrans had also kept the Nikolay Aksenenko passenger ferry on stand-by until then.

On 8 October 2022, following the Crimean Bridge explosion, Russia restarted operation of the ferry line using 'Kerch-2 ferry'.

Gallery

See also
 Kerch–Yenikale Canal

References

Ferries of Ukraine
Ferry transport in Russia
Transport in Ukraine
Transport in Crimea
Kerch Strait
Transport in Krasnodar Krai
1954 establishments in the Soviet Union
Transport in the Soviet Union
2020 disestablishments in Ukraine
2020 disestablishments in Russia
Sanctioned due to Russo-Ukrainian War